Image Flat is a rural locality in the Sunshine Coast Region, Queensland, Australia.

Geography
The locality is on the outskirts of Nambour.

History 
A rural farming area, the locale was named prior to 1896.  A government receiving office was opened in 1901. During the 1910s, the area had market gardens. Sugar cane was then complemented by a dairy industry, and later as free from frost, bananas. There was a notable Finnish population at one time.

In the late 1890s, a sugar cane tramway was constructed that terminated at Image Flat. By 1903, the line had been extended, but having to address a 1:23 grade. The cane trolleys were being drawn by horses until picked up further along by a locomotive, for the Moreton Central Sugar Cane Company Limited. A line extension was still being sought by 1923. Sugar cane pests and diseases had an impact in the local industry in 1924. In 1954, the concern had crossed to the Panama disease in bananas.

A committee was formed by 1951 seeking to bring electrical light and power to the area, although this had been proposed by a Nambour committee in 1923.

References

Suburbs of the Sunshine Coast Region
Localities in Queensland